The president of the World Bank Group is the head of World Bank Group. The president is responsible for chairing the meetings of the boards of directors and for overall management of the World Bank Group. Traditionally, the World Bank Group president has always been an American citizen nominated by the United States, the largest shareholder in the World Bank Group. The nominee is subject to confirmation by the Board of Executive Directors, to serve for a five-year, renewable term. While most World Bank Group presidents have had economic experience, some have not.

List of World Bank Group presidents
 Status

References

Notes

External links 

 President of the World Bank